TrmI may refer to:

 TRNA (adenine57-N1/adenine58-N1)-methyltransferase, an enzyme
 TRNA (adenine58-N1)-methyltransferase, an enzyme